Scyllaeidae is a taxonomic family of sea slugs, nudibranchs, marine gastropod mollusks in the superfamily Dendronotoidea.

This family is within the suborder Cladobranchia (according to the taxonomy of the Gastropoda by Bouchet & Rocroi, 2005).

Genera 
Genera in the family Scyllaeidae include:
Crosslandia Eliot, 1902
Notobryon Odhner, 1936
Scyllaea Linnaeus, 1758
Genera brought into synonymy
 Nerea Lesson, 1831: synonym of Scyllaea Linnaeus, 1758
 Zoopterygius Osbeck, 1757: synonym of Scyllaea Linnaeus, 1758 (non-binomial)

References
http://www.catalogueoflife.org/ Retrieved 16 September 2009
http://www.seaslugforum.net/ Retrieved 16 September 2009
 Vaught, K.C. (1989). A classification of the living Mollusca. American Malacologists: Melbourne, FL (USA). . XII, 195 pp.
 Pola M., Camacho-Garcia Y.E. & Gosliner T.M. (2012) Molecular data illuminate cryptic nudibranch species: the evolution of the Scyllaeidae (Nudibranchia: Dendronotina) with a revision of Notobryon. Zoological Journal of the Linnean Society 165: 311–336

External links 
 Goodheart, J. A.; Bazinet, A. L.; Valdés, Á.; Collins, A. G.; Cummings, M. P. (2017). Prey preference follows phylogeny: evolutionary dietary patterns within the marine gastropod group Cladobranchia (Gastropoda: Heterobranchia: Nudibranchia). BMC Evolutionary Biology. 17(1)
  Bouchet, P. & Rocroi, J.-P. (2005). Classification and nomenclator of gastropod families. Malacologia. 47 (1-2): 1-397